Stenoidion is a genus of beetles in the family Cerambycidae, containing the following species:
 Stenoidion amphigyum Martins, 1970
 Stenoidion apicatum (Martins, 1962)
 Stenoidion corallinum (Bates, 1870)
 Stenoidion schmidi Martins & Galileo, 2009

References

Ibidionini